The Toronto Six Days was a six-day track cycling race held in Toronto, Canada.

Its first edition dates back to 1912. It was held until 1965 with long breaks between editions.

William Peden holds the record of victories, winning 4 times.

Winners

References

External links 

Cycle races in Canada
Six-day races
Recurring sporting events established in 1912
1912 establishments in Canada
Defunct cycling races in Canada
Recurring sporting events disestablished in 1965
1965 disestablishments in Canada